Lu Yao (born 26 June 1993 in Kaifeng, Henan) is a Chinese professional football player who currently plays for Chinese club Yuxi Yukun.

Club career
In July 2012, Lu Yao started his professional footballer career with Henan Jianye in the Chinese Super League.  On 16 August 2015, Lu made his debut for Henan in the 2015 Chinese Super League against Guangzhou R&F, coming on as a substitute for Yin Hongbo in the 57th minute.

Career statistics 
Statistics accurate as of match played 31 December 2020.

References

External links
 

 
1993 births
Living people
Chinese footballers
People from Kaifeng
Footballers from Henan
Henan Songshan Longmen F.C. players
Chinese Super League players
Association football midfielders